Sharples Homestead is a historic home located in West Chester, Chester County, Pennsylvania. It was built between 1799 and 1805, and is a -story, three-bay brick dwelling in the Federal style. It has a two-story, two-bay wing with a -story, stone kitchen addition.  A one-story kitchen addition was added to the front of the wing in 1884. Also on the property is a contributing two-story carriage house built about 1888. The property was continuously occupied by the Sharples family from its construction until 1985.

It was listed on the National Register of Historic Places in 1985.

References

West Chester, Pennsylvania
Houses on the National Register of Historic Places in Pennsylvania
Federal architecture in Pennsylvania
Houses completed in 1805
Houses in Chester County, Pennsylvania
1805 establishments in Pennsylvania
National Register of Historic Places in Chester County, Pennsylvania